Clarence R. Weed (September 1, 1885 – December 19, 1966) was an American football and basketball coach. He served as the head football coach at Buchtel College—now known as the University of Akron—for one season in 1909, compiling a record of 4–4. Weed also coached the men's basketball team at Buchtel that academic year, 1909–10, tallying a mark of 5–3. Weed was a graduate of Olivet College and the University of Michigan.

Head coaching record

Football

Basketball

References

External links
 

1885 births
1966 deaths
Akron Zips football coaches
Akron Zips men's basketball coaches
Basketball coaches from Michigan
Olivet College alumni
University of Michigan alumni
People from Lapeer, Michigan
Sportspeople from Metro Detroit